Thomas Hamilton-Brown (born 1 July 1916) is a South African boxer who competed in the 1936 Summer Olympics.

He was born in Cape Town.

In 1936 he was eliminated in the first round of the lightweight class after losing his fight to Carlos Lillo. He had originally won the bout but due to a scoring miscalculation he did not find this out until several days later, when he had gone on an eating binge and was too heavy for his weight class.

References

External links
Thomas Hamilton-Brown's profile at Sports Reference.com
Thomas Hamilton-Brown at olympic.org
  

1916 births
Possibly living people
Lightweight boxers
Olympic boxers of South Africa
Boxers at the 1936 Summer Olympics
Sportspeople from Cape Town
South African male boxers